Bryan Harper (born 1927) is an Australian sprint canoeist who competed in the late 1950s. At the 1956 Summer Olympics in Melbourne, he finished seventh in the C-1 1000 m event and ninth in the C-1 10000 m event.

References
Bryan Harper's profile at Sports Reference.com

1927 births
Living people
Australian male canoeists
Canoeists at the 1956 Summer Olympics
Olympic canoeists of Australia
20th-century Australian people